William Angelo Fiorelli (March 30, 1926 – June 30, 2007), better known as Bill Farrell, was a Cleveland-born recording artist in the 1950s on the MGM, Mercury Records and TEL record labels.

In 1947, Bob Hope was in a night club in Buffalo, New York and saw Farrell perform. Hope was impressed with Farrell's powerful baritone voice and smooth delivery and he invited Farrell to Hollywood. Hope featured him on his weekly radio show with Doris Day, and Les Brown and his Orchestra.

MGM released "Shrimp Boats" b/w "Cry" in October 1951 on the 45-rpm disc K11113.
This particular 45 rpm print was issued shortly after the decision was made to make available to the general public 45 rpm records, and discontinuing the 78 rpm records in favor of the size, weight and packaging.

TEL released "If" b/w "You Were Only Fooling" in late 1951 on the 45 rpm disc C1000.
This is (reportedly) the first 45 rpm print released by a division of United Telefilm Records, Inc.

Farrell enjoyed minor hits with his recordings of "Circus" (1949 - reached No. 26 in Billboard charts); "It Isn't Fair" (1950, reached No. 20); and "My Heart Cries for You" (1951, reached No. 18).

Larry Ellman hired him in 1961 to lead sing-along sessions in his restaurant The Cattleman on Lexington Avenue, in New York City, every evening from 9 until 2 a.m. These were very successful and brought a 20% increase in sales for the restaurant in the first few months.

Farrell died on June 30, 2007, at age 81 in Rancho Mirage, California.

Discography
 Lush Life (Dobre Records DR1034, 1978)
 Maybe This Time (Dobre Records DR1064, 1978)
 Sings Favorite Concertos (Dobre Records DR1065)
 Shrimp Boats / Cry (MGM label K11113, 1951)
 You've Changed (MGM label 10519, 1949) 78rpm
 Am I Blue? / I Cover the Waterfront (Mercury label, 70779, recorded December 29, 1955)
 A Man Called Peter / Pagliacci (Esquire Mercury label A-1211) Australian 78rpm
 My Heart Cries for You MGM label 10868, 1950)
 It Isn't Fair (MGM label 10637, 1950)
 Love Locked Out (MGM label 10840, 1950)
 Circus (MGM label 10488, 1949)
 Kaw-Liga (MGM label K11424, 1953)
 Honky Tonk Song (CBS-Epic 9211, 1957)
 Yeah Yeah (Philips label PB828, 1958)
 Slippin' and Slidin' / Cherry Lips (Imperial label X7001) unknown year of release

References

1926 births
2007 deaths
Musicians from Cleveland
20th-century American singers
20th-century American male singers